is a private university in Toyohashi, Aichi, Japan. The predecessor of the school, a junior college, was founded in 1983. It became a four-year college in 1996.

Toyohashi Sozo Junior College 
It became partially coeducational from April 1, 1991. The college became women-only again from April 1, 1997, partially coeducational again from April 1, 2000, and then completely coeducational from April 1, 2005. The junior college offers courses in childcare.

References

External links
 Official website 

Educational institutions established in 1983
Private universities and colleges in Japan
Universities and colleges in Aichi Prefecture
1983 establishments in Japan
Toyohashi